Klimaszewski may refer to:

 Andrzej Klimaszewski (canoeist) (born 1954), Polish sprint canoer
 Andrzej Klimaszewski (athlete) (born 1960), Polish long jumper
 Mieczysław Klimaszewski (1908–1995), Polish geographer
 Jerzy Klimaszewski (1903–1945), Polish actor
 The Klimaszewski Twins, Elaine and Diane, also known as the Coors Light Twins